2012 in film is an overview of events, including the highest-grossing films, award ceremonies, critics' lists of the best films of 2012, festivals, a list of country-specific lists of films released, and notable deaths. Most notably, the two oldest surviving American film studios, Universal and Paramount both celebrated their centennial anniversaries, marking the first time that two major film studios celebrate 100 years, and the Dolby Atmos sound format was launched for the premiere of Brave. The James Bond film series celebrated its 50th anniversary and released its 23rd film, Skyfall. Six box-office blockbusters from previous years (Beauty and the Beast, Star Wars: Episode I – The Phantom Menace, Titanic, Raiders of the Lost Ark, Finding Nemo, and Monsters, Inc.) were re-released in 3D and IMAX. Also, the year marked the debut for high frame rate technology. The first film using 48 F.P.S., a higher frame rate than the film industry standard 24 F.P.S., was The Hobbit: An Unexpected Journey.

Evaluation of the year
Richard Brody of The New Yorker said, "2012 has been a good year for Hollywood and off-Hollywood. Note, once more, the remarkable Hollywood nexus of the Gotham and Independent Spirit nominees, as the path of independent financing becomes ever more significant for filmmakers whose work doesn’t fit into franchise formatting. And that’s a good thing, from the perspective of filmmaking—whether it means that directors and actors share producers’ risks in getting their work made, or that complicit producers give a director's vision free rein. But the latter notion makes some critics uneasy. There's an undercurrent of thought—one rooted in an antiquated and nostalgic vision of a halcyon classic Hollywood that supposedly both reached the masses and made modest and un-self-conscious art—that looks to producers to restrain the idiosyncrasies of directors and fit them into a readily marketable package of popular appeal. These critics yearn for the adversarial relationship of producer and director, seeing the producer as the supporter of democratic values and the director as a sort of egomaniacal élitist who, unrestrained, would spend someone else's money frivolously to make a movie that would please himself and his friends. Of course, that relationship becomes adversarial only if the producer doesn't see himself as a sort of benefactor, a patron of the arts whose very role is to finance and to foster individual expression—and, as ever, it all depends on who the individual is and what the nature of the vision is. It's fairly obvious that strong producers improve films made by mediocre directors but often constrain or dilute the distinctiveness and individuality of the work of good ones. There is a political agenda hidden within the critics’ aesthetic preference for the strong hand of the producer, as critics demagogically put themselves in the position of defenders of the people—defending them from radical outliers and finding popular tastes with which to align themselves. It's another case of left and right agreeing without common ground and leading to bad policy—and, in this case, bad art." In August 2012 BFI announced their 2012 Sight & Sound Greatest films of all Time survey which was topped for the first time by Vertigo.

Highest-grossing films 

The top 10 films released in 2012 by worldwide gross are as follows:

The Avengers grossed over $1.5 billion and it became the third highest-grossing film of all time. Skyfall, The Dark Knight Rises, and The Hobbit: An Unexpected Journey have each grossed over $1 billion, making them among the highest-grossing films of all time.

2012 box office records
 The Hunger Games was the first film of 2012 to pass the $500 million mark worldwide, and is also the first film since Avatar to place first at the U.S. box office for four consecutive weekends.
 Skyfall became the first film to gross more than £100 million, amassing a total of £102.9 million.
 With their 3-D re-releases, two films achieved new milestones: Star Wars: Episode I – The Phantom Menace reached $1.027 billion, and Titanic reached $2.187 billion, becoming the second film to surpass the $2 billion mark, following Avatar.
 2012 was the first year to have four films cross the billion-dollar milestone, surpassing the previous year's record of three billion-dollar films.

Events 
 1st AACTA International Awards
 14th Jutra Awards
 18th Screen Actors Guild Awards
 32nd Genie Awards
 32nd Golden Raspberry Awards
 38th People's Choice Awards
 38th Saturn Awards
 62nd Berlin International Film Festival
 65th British Academy Film Awards
 69th Golden Globe Awards
 69th Venice International Film Festival
 84th Academy Awards
 2012 Cannes Film Festival
 2012 MTV Movie Awards
 2012 Toronto International Film Festival

Awards

2012 films 
The list of films released in 2012, arranged by country, are as follows:
 List of American films of 2012
 List of Argentine films of 2012
 List of Australian films of 2012
 List of Brazilian films of 2012
 List of British films of 2012
 List of French films of 2012
 List of Hong Kong films of 2012
 List of Italian films of 2012
 List of Indian films of 2012
 List of Assamese films
 List of Bengali films of 2012
 List of Bollywood films of 2012
 List of Gujarati films
 List of Kannada films of 2012
 List of Malayalam films of 2012
 List of Marathi films of 2012
 List of Odia films of 2012
 List of Punjabi films of 2012
 List of Tamil films of 2012
 List of Telugu films of 2012
 List of Tulu films
 List of Japanese films of 2012
 List of Mexican films of the 2010s
 List of Pakistani films of 2012
 List of Russian films of 2012
 List of South Korean films of 2012
 List of Spanish films of 2012

Births
April 23 - Alan Kim, American actor

Deaths

Film debuts
John Bradley - Anna Karenina
Hannibal Buress - Sleepwalk with Me
Emilia Clarke - Spike Island
Cara Delevingne - Anna Karenina
Ryan Guzman - Step Up Revolution
Kit Harington - Silent Hill: Revelation
Leslie Odom Jr. - Red Tails

References

External link

 
Film by year